Kaulsdorf-Nord is a surface level Berlin U-Bahn station located on the . Alternate trains from Hauptbanhof will end at this station.

History
The station was originally named Hellersdorfer Straße in the planning stage. The station opened in July 1989, just a few months before the fall of the Berlin Wall. The eastern extension of the line E was one of the last major construction projects of the former German Democratic Republic.

In the beginning the name was Albert-Norden-Straße. On 2 October 1991, after the reunification the road was changed to Cecilienstraße while the station's name is renamed to Kaulsdorf Nord.

References

U5 (Berlin U-Bahn) stations
Buildings and structures in Marzahn-Hellersdorf
Railway stations in Germany opened in 1989
1989 establishments in East Germany